The Chidsey Library or Chidsey Building is a historic building located in Sarasota, Florida at 701 North Tamiami Trail. The building was home to the city's first public library from 1941 to 1976.

History
The library's design was done by Martin Studio of Architecture consisting of Thomas Reed Martin and Frank C. Martin. The Chidsey Library opened in May 1941 as the City of Sarasota's first public library building. The building was dedicated to John and Ida Chidsey in November 1941 as they made the building possible by helping pay for the majority of the cost for the project which was approximately $25,000, .

In 1974, Sarasota County assumed responsibility of all public libraries throughout the county. The building was used as a library until 1976, when library operations moved to Selby Library at 1001 Boulevard of the Arts. At the same time, Sarasota County Historical Resources moved into a portion of the Chidsey Library. The county's Historical Resources fully occupied the Chidsey Building in 1998, when library operations moved to its current location at Selby Public Library.

References

External links

 Sarasota County listings at National Register of Historic Places
 Florida's Office of Cultural and Historical Programs

National Register of Historic Places in Sarasota County, Florida
Buildings and structures in Sarasota, Florida
1941 establishments in Florida
Library buildings completed in 1941
Former library buildings in the United States
Museums in Sarasota, Florida
Libraries on the National Register of Historic Places in Florida
Works Progress Administration in Florida